Prairie Dog Township may refer to one of the following places in the United States:

 Prairie Dog Township, Decatur County, Kansas
 Prairie Dog Township, Sheridan County, Kansas
 Prairie Dog Township, Harlan County, Nebraska

See also
Prairie Township (disambiguation)
Prairie Creek Township (disambiguation)

Township name disambiguation pages